5-hydroxytryptamine receptor 3C is a protein that in humans is encoded by the HTR3C gene.  The protein encoded by this gene is a subunit of the 5-HT3 receptor.

References

Further reading

External links
 

Serotonin receptors
Ion channels